The Basketligaen Most Valuable Player is an annual basketball award that is given by the Danish top tier Basketligaen. It is awarded to the player who was considered to be the best in a given regular season.

Winners

References

European basketball awards
Basketball most valuable player awards
Basketligaen